Henry E. Rohlsen Airport  is a public airport located six miles (10 km) southwest of Christiansted on the island of St. Croix in the United States Virgin Islands. The airport is named after Henry E. Rohlsen, a St. Croix native who was one of the Tuskegee Airmen during World War II.

It is a small international airport that hosts mainly inter-Caribbean flights. The airport, which was a hub for Aero Virgin Islands in the 1970s and 1980s, has the capability to receive jets up to the size of the Boeing 747s. Prior to 1996 the airport was known as Alexander Hamilton International Airport, and was renamed that year.

History

During World War II, the United States Army Air Forces Sixth Air Force stationed the 12th Bombardment Squadron (25th Bombardment Group) at the airport for antisubmarine patrols flying B-18 Bolo aircraft from November 8, 1941 to November 10, 1942. During the time the airport was operated by the military it was named Benedict Airfield. When the airport was transferred to civilian control it was renamed to honor former St. Croix resident Alexander Hamilton.

Historically, a number of airlines operated scheduled passenger jet service into St. Croix in the past. These air carriers included Air Florida with Douglas DC-9-10s, Caribair with McDonnell Douglas DC-9-30s, Continental Airlines with Boeing 727-200s, Eastern Airlines with Boeing 727-100s, 727-200s and 757-200s, Midway Airlines with Boeing 737-200s, Pan Am with Boeing 727-200s as well as wide body Airbus A300B4s  and Trans Caribbean Airways with Boeing 727-200s. One air carrier that has served St. Croix for many years is American Airlines. In 1974, American was serving the airport with Boeing 707 and Boeing 727-100 jetliners with nonstop flights to New York City. In 1994, American was operating Airbus A300-600R wide body jets into St. Croix with nonstop service to Miami. A Boeing 747 carrying relief supplies during the aftermath of Hurricane Marilyn landed at the airport in 1995. Satellite imagery in Google Earth shows the presence of C-17 and C-130 military transports in 2006 and 2015.

On Sunday, November 11, 2018, the second largest cargo airplane in the world, the Antonov An-124 landed on St. Croix to deliver building supplies for houses as part of the hurricane recovery.

Facilities and aircraft
For the 12-month period ending September 30, 2013, the airport had 36,287 aircraft operations, an average of 99 per day: 68% air taxi, 25% general aviation, 6% scheduled commercial and 1% military. In the same period, there were also 36 aircraft based at this airport, including 11 single-engine, 15 multi-engine, 5 jets, four military aircraft and one helicopter.

Terminal modernization and expansion project
In August 2018, the Virgin Islands Port Authority (VIPA) held a charrette to announce and discuss the expansion and renovation of the terminal. 
On March 14, 2019, the VIPA announced bidding for phase one of the upgrade project to be in September. The renovation was expected to be complete within a year.

VIPA had begun the Henry E. Rohlsen Airport Terminal Expansion and Modernization Project as of September 2020. The improvements to the terminal will be completed in four phases over a six-year period.

Phase one entails enclosing 5,500 square feet of walkway space to increase the seating capacity in the lounge, refurbishing the existing passenger lounge space and restrooms, enclosing the 1,100 square-foot open-air gardens with a new roof structure to provide additional concessions space, and upgrading the mechanical systems for the additional air-conditioned area.

Phase one is estimated to cost $8.6 million and was funded via a $7 million grant from the US Department of Commerce- Economic Development Administration in 2019 with a local match of $1.6 million from the VI Port Authority. The construction was anticipated to take 18 months and be completed in March 2022. However, the project is ahead of schedule and should be completed before the end of the Calendar Year 2021.

Phases two through four include the addition of a second level to accommodate jet bridges, additional hold room, concession and retail space, improvement of passenger flow and baggage handling in the terminal; redesign, expansion, and modernization of the interior of the terminal to make the best use of the existing floor plan; the addition of vibrant, tropical landscaping; and changes to improve the flow of vehicular traffic. Expanding the terminal will allow St. Croix to take full advantage of its 10,000-foot runway.

While Phase 1 of the HERA Terminal Expansion is fully funded, VIPA is actively seeking funding sources for Phases 2 through 4. The project is estimated to cost a total of $140 million...

On Monday, December 21, 2021, phase one of the terminal expansion and modernization project has been completed 

The Virgin Islands Port Authority celebrates Phase One of the Henry E. Rohlsen Terminal Expansion and Modernization Project, and now work commences on 
Phase II, which is to the construction of jet bridges and the build-out of the second floor of the terminal.

The tour of airport development experts continued on St. Croix.

Airlines and destinations

Cargo

Statistics

Top destinations

Airline market share

Accidents and incidents
 On July 24, 1979, Prinair Flight 610 crashed shortly after takeoff from Alexander Hamilton Airport. One crew member and seven passengers were killed.
 On December 7, 2017, at about 8:54 p.m., a private plane, a Beech Baron on its way to St. Thomas, had to return to St. Croix due to an emergency and crashed before it could make it to the runway, resulting in five fatalities. A preliminary investigation revealed that engine failure was the cause of the crash. It was also revealed that the pilot operating the aircraft was unqualified to fly multi-engine airplanes.

References

External links

 Virgin Islands Port Authority: Airport Facilities, official site
 
 
 

|}

Airports in the United States Virgin Islands
Airfields of the United States Army Air Forces in the United States
Saint Croix, U.S. Virgin Islands